The Australian Wildlife Society was founded in Sydney, Australia in May 1909 as the Wildlife Preservation Society of Australia (WPSA) to encourage the protection of, and cultivate an interest in, Australian flora and fauna.  The founding president of the Society was The Hon. Frederick Earle Winchcombe MLC.  David Stead was one of four vice presidents and a very active founder of the Society.

The current president is Dr Julie Old, and the Society publishes a quarterly magazine Australian Wildlife.  Australian Wildlife Society is a national not-for-profit wildlife conservation organisation.  The Society is dedicated to the conservation of Australian wildlife through national environmental education, public awareness, advocacy, hands-on wildlife conservation work, and community involvement. The organization is registered with the Australian Charities and Not-for-profit Commission.

History 
In 2009, the Society celebrated a centenary of wildlife conservation.

In 2013, the Wildlife Preservation Society of Australia was rebranded as the Australian Wildlife Society (AWS).

In 2019, the Australian Wildlife Society celebrated its 110th Birthday and released a birthday video in collaboration with Design Centre Enmore TAFE New South Wales. In the same year, the board engaged its first paid employee – National Office Manager Ms Megan Fabian.

In 2020, the Society established a new National Head Office in Hurstville, New South Wales.

In 2021, the Society established 'Snip Rings for Wildlife', a campaign that aims to raise awareness and encourage individuals to protect Australia’s wildlife, by cutting through plastic rings, rubber bands, hair ties, the loops of facemasks, and plastic dome-shaped lids, in their entirety, before disposing of them. 

In 2022, the Society increased the value of its annual University Research Grants to ten $3,000 grants – totalling $30,000 each year.

Serventy Conservation Medal
The Serventy Conservation Medal was inaugurated in 1999 to commemorate conservation work by members of the Serventy family, the siblings Lucy, Dominic and Vincent Serventy.  The award honours conservation work that has not been done as part of a professional career for which the person will have been paid and honoured, but for work done for a love of nature and a determination that it should be conserved.  The first award of the Medal was made in 1998.  People who have been awarded the Medal are:
 1998 – Margaret Thorsborne – for work in the conservation of local fruit pigeons and cassowaries and environmental conservation at Mission Beach, Queensland
 1999 – Bernie Clarke – for lifetime devotion as a local environmentalist and long-time Towra/Botany Bay campaigner
 2000 – Judy Messer – for outstanding contribution to conservation and environmental protection work in New South Wales
 2001 – Ron Taylor and Valerie Taylor – for promoting a greater understanding of the Great Barrier Reef and the need to protect its wildlife
 2002 – John and Cecily Fenton – for wildlife habitat conservation on their property, Lanark, in south western Victoria
 2003 – Lance Ferris – of the Australian Seabird Rescue team
 2004 – Wayne Reynolds – for work with the Cape Solander Whale Migration Study on the coast of the Royal National Park, Sydney
 2005 – Lyall Kenneth Metcalfe – for lifetime contribution to the conservation movement in New South Wales and the Northern Territory
 2006 – Lindsay Smith – for wildlife conservation work involving seabirds
 2007 – Bev Smiles – for dedication to the conservation of native forests in New South Wales
 2008 – Barry Scott – of the Koala Foundation, for dedication to Koala conservation
 2009 – June Butcher – for dedication in promoting the welfare of native animals
 2010 – Helen George – for dedication to the welfare of native animals
 2011 – Jenny Maclean – for her contributions to saving the spectacled flying fox
 2012 – Bob Irwin – for services to conservation and education
 2013 – Not awarded
 2014 – Helen Bergen and Ray Mjadwesch – for helping injured animals
 2015 – John Weigel – of the Australian Reptile Park, for his work to help the Tasmanian devil
 2016 – Awarded jointly to Graeme Sawyer – Lord Mayor of Darwin from 2008–2012
 2017 – Jennie Gilbert
 2018 – Lorraine Vass of Lismore, New South Wales
 2019 – Alexandra Seddon of Merimbula, New South Wales
 2020 – Professor Kevin Kenneally AM of Scarborough, Western Australia
 2021 – Maureen Christie of Aberfoyle Park, South Australia

References

External links
 
 
 
 
 

Nature conservation organisations based in Australia
1909 establishments in Australia
Wildlife conservation organizations